Lynn Adams (born 1958) is a former racquetball player.

Lynn(e) Adams may also refer to:

Lynn Adams (golfer) (born 1950), American golfer
Lynne Adams (born 1946), American actress
Lynne Adams (born ????), Canadian actress

See also
Linda Adams (disambiguation)